Drench may also refer to:

 Drench (Transformers), an autobot in the Transformers franchise
 Steven Drench (born 1985), English footballer
 Drench, any anthelmintic drug used in deworming
 "Drench", a song from the 2002 album In Our Gun by Gomez
 "Drench", a song from the 2014 eponymous album Casualties of Cool
 Jessica Drench, executive director of the American nonprofit 826 Boston

See also 
 Drenched, a 1992 album by Miracle Legion